Coșovei is a Romanian surname. Notable people with the surname include:

Traian Coșovei (1921–1993), Romanian writer and poet
Traian T. Coșovei (1954–2014), Romanian poet, son of Traian

Romanian-language surnames